Azerbaijan participated in the 2010 Summer Youth Olympics in Singapore with 12 athletes.

Medalists

Boxing 

Boys

Canoeing 

Boys

Judo 

Boys

Team

Taekwondo 

Boys

Weightlifting 

Boys

Wrestling 

Freestyle
Boys

Girls

Greco-Roman

References
 Азербайджан на I летних юношеских Олимпийских играх представят 12 спортсменов. Article by Rasim Babayev.

External links
Competitors List: Azerbaijan

2010 in Azerbaijani sport
Nations at the 2010 Summer Youth Olympics
Azerbaijan at the Youth Olympics